Raffel is a surname. Notable people with the surname include:

Burton Raffel (1928–2015), American translator, poet and teacher
Dawn Raffel, American writer
Forrest & Leroy Raffel, founders of Arby's
Kanishka Raffel, Australian Anglican dean
Keith Raffel, American novelist, technology executive, university lecturer, and former U.S. Senate counsel
Suhanya Raffel, museum director
Varsha Raffel (born 1975), Indian cricketer
Surnames from given names